Oochiton is an extinct genus of polyplacophoran molluscs. Oochiton became extinct during the Miocene period.

References 

Prehistoric chiton genera